Cheever is an English surname. It is from Anglo-Norman French chivere, chevre ‘goat’ (Latin capra ‘nanny goat’), applied as a nickname for an unpredictable or temperamental person, or a metonymic occupational name for a goatherd.

Notable people with the surname include:

 Abijah Cheever (1760–1843), American doctor and politician, descendant of Ezekiel Cheever
 Benjamin Cheever (born 1948), American writer and editor, son of John Cheever
 Benjamin H. Cheever Jr. (1850–1930), US Army officer 
 Charles A. Cheever (1852–1900), American inventor and businessman
 Charlie Cheever (born 1981), American engineer and businessman, one of the founders of the website Quora
 Eddie Cheever (born 1958), American racing driver
 Eddie Cheever III (born 1993), Italian racing driver, son of Eddie Cheever
 Ezekiel Cheever (1614–1708), England-born schoolmaster
 George B. Cheever (1807–1890), American minister and abolitionist writer
 John Cheever (1912–1982), American novelist and short story writer
 Jonathan Cheever (born 1985), American snowboarder
 Joseph Cheever (1772–1872), American farmer and politician, brother of Abijah Cheever
 Michael Cheever (born 1973), American football center in the National Football League
 Ross Cheever (born 1964), American racing driver, brother of Eddie Cheever
 Susan Cheever (born 1943), American author, daughter of John Cheever

Surnames of English origin